Tianwen Tony Cai (born March, 1967) is a Chinese statistician. He is the Daniel H. Silberberg Professor of Statistics and Vice Dean at the Wharton School of the University of Pennsylvania. He is also  professor of Applied Math & Computational Science Graduate Group, and associate scholar at the Department of Biostatistics, Epidemiology & Informatics, Perelman School of Medicine, University of Pennsylvania. In 2008 Tony Cai was awarded the COPSS Presidents' Award.

Early life and education 
Cai was born in Rui'an, Wenzhou, Zhejiang, China. In 1986, he graduated from the Department of Mathematics, Hangzhou University (previous and current Department of Mathematics, Zhejiang University), at 18 years old. In 1989, he then received an M.Sc. from Shanghai Jiao Tong University and in 1996, earned a PhD from Cornell University

Career
Tony Cai  was appointed the Dorothy Silberberg Professor at the Wharton School of the University of Pennsylvania from July 1, 2007  to July 31, 2018 and has been the Daniel H. Silberberg Professor at Wharton since August 1, 2018. Cai has been the Vice Dean of the Wharton School since August 1, 2017.

Tony Cai's research focuses on high-dimensional statistics, statistical machine learning, large-scale inference, nonparametric function estimation, functional data analysis,  and statistical decision theory, and applications to genomics, compressed sensing, chemical identification, medical imaging, and financial engineering.

Tony Cai was elected a Fellow of the Institute of Mathematical Statistics in 2006.

In 2008, he received the COPSS Presidents’ Award from the Committee of Presidents of Statistical Societies.

In 2009, Tony Cai was named the Medallion Lecturer at the Institute of Mathematical Statistics.

In 2017, he was elected to the presidency of International Chinese Statistical Association (ICSA).

Additional affiliations and memberships 
Tony Cai was a co-editor of the leading statistics journal, the Annals of Statistics from 2010 to 2012. He has also served on editorial boards of several other journals, including Journal of the American Statistical Association (JASA), Journal of the Royal Statistical Society Series B (JRSSB), Statistics Surveys, and Statistica Sinica.

Honors and awards
 Fellow, Institute of Mathematical Statistics, 2006.
COPSS Presidents' Award 2008, Committee of Presidents of Statistical Societies.

Personal life 
Cai has four brothers and one sister. His sister Tianxi Cai  is the John Rock Professor of Population and Translational Data Sciences in the Department of Biostatistics at the Harvard T.H. Chan School of Public Health. She is also a professor at Harvard Medical School. Topics in her research include biomarkers, personalized medicine, survival analysis, and health informatics. His brother Tianwu Michael Cai, majored in physics (PhD, Rochester) is a vice-president of Goldman Sachs. Tony Cai has two children, a son and daughter.

External links
 T. Tony Cai's homepage at the Wharton School of University of Pennsylvania
 校友蔡天文荣获国际统计学“考普斯”奖 (Zhejiang University (ZJU) news: Alumnus T.Tony Cai wins 2008 COPSS Presidents' Award)

References

1967 births
Living people
Scientists from Wenzhou
Zhejiang University alumni
Hangzhou University alumni
Cornell University alumni
Wharton School of the University of Pennsylvania faculty
Shanghai Jiao Tong University alumni
Fellows of the Institute of Mathematical Statistics
People from Rui'an
Chinese statisticians
Chinese emigrants to the United States
American statisticians
Mathematicians from Zhejiang
Educators from Wenzhou
Purdue University faculty
Annals of Statistics editors
Mathematical statisticians